1889-90 marked the 4th season of the club that was to become Arsenal F.C. They remained at the Manor Field in Plumstead for the second consecutive season, and competed in four cup competitions, including the FA Cup, for the first time, reaching the fourth qualifying round. This season saw Arsenal win their first silverware, in the form of the Kent Senior Cup and the London Charity Cup, whilst also finishing runners up in the London Senior Cup.

Players 
Below is a list of players who made at least one appearance for Royal Arsenal during the season, with number of appearances, and goals. Debutantes are marked in Bold, whilst goalkeepers are marked in Italics. David Danskin again captained Arsenal for the season. Out of 41 games played across the season, 39 full lineups were recorded, with the other 2 games line-ups being partially recorded.

Matches 
Below is a list of results of all fixtures played by the Royal Arsenal during the season. Out of 41 games, 4 of these were FA Cup fixtures, another 11 were competitive fixtures for other cups. They also played 26 friendlies. The overall season record stands at 31 wins, 5 draws, and 5 losses.

References

Arsenal F.C. seasons
Arsenal